Eric Muenter (March 25, 1871 – July 6, 1915), also known as Erich Münter, Erich Muenter, Erich Holt or Frank Holt, was a German-American political terrorist, activist, spy, professor and would-be assassin. Although employed as a German professor at elite American universities, he was actually a spy and a "fanatic in the clandestine service of the Imperial German government." While an instructor at Harvard University, he poisoned and killed his pregnant wife.

He appeared as Cornell University professor Frank Holt who contacted the German spy network which undertook to sabotage US aid to the war in Europe against Germany.  In 1915, he planted a bomb that exploded in the US Capitol, shot Jack Morgan, son of financier J. P. Morgan in his home, and predicted the bombing of a steamship bound for England before committing suicide while in police custody.  His activities, and those of other Germans, were played up by the press as "Hun barbarity"; anti-German feelings rose in the years as America eventually entered the war with Germany.

Biography

Murder of wife 

While teaching German at Harvard University in 1906 he poisoned his pregnant wife. Leona Muenter ( Krembs) died on April 16, 1906, of arsenic poisoning. On April 27, 1906, Cambridge, Massachusetts police issued a warrant for the arrest of Erich Muenter. On June 5, 1906, Muenter mailed a pamphlet entitled "Protest" to his wife's family from New Orleans. He vowed that he would "annihilate" Chicago and Cambridge in one blow if he could for accusing him of poisoning his wife, and claimed that he actually feared the punishment inflicted on Christian Scientists who refused medical treatment.  He fled before this was discovered, and spent the next decade in various places in the United States under assumed identities.  He was a committed German nationalist and opposed the US policy of selling arms to Great Britain and France, Germany's enemies in World War I.

German saboteur 

Muenter went underground in Mexico for a period, then emerged in Texas under a new identity and married a new wife. He got jobs in colleges, working his way up to the Ivy League as professor of German "Frank Holt" at Cornell University. In 1915, Muenter was inspired by the book The War and America by Hugo Münsterberg, another German sympathizer. He became involved with the German spy group Abteilung IIIb, which planted time bombs on vessels carrying arms for the Allies from US ports.

German intelligence was later alleged to have supported his attacks, but Muenter maintained he was just an angry peace activist acting on his own. Muenter clearly had connections to the German network and taunted authorities with veiled statements about Abteilung IIIB's ship sabotage efforts.

1915 United States Capitol bomb attack 

On July 2, 1915, Muenter hid a package containing three sticks of dynamite with a timing mechanism set for nearly midnight under a telephone switchboard in the Senate reception room in the United States Capitol, Washington, D.C. His original target had been the Senate chamber, which he found locked. The bomb exploded at approximately 11:40 PM, resulting in no casualties. Muenter wrote a letter to The Washington Star under a pseudonym R. Pearce, explaining his actions, which were published after the bombing. He said he hoped the explosion would "make enough noise to be heard above the voices that clamor for war. This explosion is an exclamation point in my appeal for peace."

SS Minnehaha steamship bomb attack 

After setting off the bomb in the Capitol, he fled to New York City, where he hid a pencil bomb timed explosive on  SS Minnehaha, a ship loaded with munitions bound for Britain.

Shooting of J. P. Morgan Jr. 

Under the alias of Frank Holt, Muenter took a train and a cab to the East Island, Glen Cove, New York estate of J. P. Morgan on July 3, 1915. The millionaire financier Morgan had helped Britain finance its war effort against Germany. He carried a small suitcase with newspaper clippings against arms shipments, and a few sticks of dynamite, while in his coat he carried two revolvers and another stick of dynamite. Muenter rang the front doorbell. When the butler opened the door, Muenter presented a business card and demanded to see Mr. Morgan. When the butler balked after he would not state his business, Muenter pulled out both revolvers and ran into the house looking for Morgan. When he encountered children, he pointed a pistol at them and had them follow. On the staircase, he shouted "Now, Mr. Morgan, I have you!" as Mrs. Morgan tried to block the path to her husband, but Morgan lunged at his attacker and tackled Muenter to the ground as he fired two rounds into Morgan's groin and thigh. Having pinned Muenter to the ground, Morgan twisted one revolver out of Muenter's hand as his wife and others grabbed the other. Muenter was heard to cry "Kill me! Kill me now! I don't want to live anymore. I have been in a perfect hell
for the last six months on account of the European war." Morgan's butler finished subduing Muenter, beating him senseless with a lump of coal. Morgan recovered quickly, returning to work on August 14. 

Muenter refused to identify himself to police, saying only that he was a Christian gentleman who wanted to persuade Morgan to end the war.
However, a tip was soon received pointing out a resemblance between "Holt" and Muenter, who was still wanted in Cambridge for the poisoning of his wife.
Harvard official Charles Apted, who had lived near Muenter in Cambridge, was dispatched to New York, where he identified Muenter,

In his jacket he had written down the names of Morgan's four children, and a clipped cartoon of Lady Liberty pointing to a crate of fireworks, representing the European war, telling Uncle Sam that they are "dangerous fireworks". He also circled some sailings on a schedule for merchant vessels leaving New York. He told police that his original intention was to take Morgan's wife and children hostage to force Morgan to help stop munitions shipments to Europe, though on at least one occasion he admitted he also intended to assassinate Morgan. Authorities quickly connected him to the Capitol bombings and the wife poisoning case. A search of the suitcase found a handwritten letter addressed to "His Majesty the German Kaiser" similar to letters he mailed out at the time of the bombing of the Capitol signed "R. Pearce". The Morgan shooting made world headlines the next Sunday morning, the 4th of July.

Bomb-making materials 

Captain Thomas J. Tunney, head of New York City Police Department's Bomb Squad, tricked Muenter into confessing details how he had made the timer for the Capitol bomb, but he would not tell all until July 7. Police tracked down a trunk Muenter had placed in storage in New York City. Inspector of Combustibles Owen Egan declared it "the greatest equipment for bomb making ever brought to New York" with 134 sticks of dynamite, blasting caps, coils of fuse, batteries, nitric acid, windproof matches, mercury fulminate, smokeless explosive powder. Three explosive tin can bombs had been recently completed.

Death

There is some dispute on how Muenter died on July 6, 1915. Muenter tried to kill himself on the night of July 5 by slashing his wrist but this failed to kill him. The next day a prison guard failed to lock his cell and when the guard stepped away, at 10:30, Muenter somehow found his way to the roof and jumped  to his death. An investigation ruled the death a suicide.   In Howard Blum's In Dark Invasion he writes that New York's counterterrorism police at first believed that he was killed by an assassin sent to silence him with two bullets in the head. But the version they decided on was that Muenter ran out of a briefly opened door and jumped head-first onto the concrete floor of the jail corridor (this source says he fell to his death from ).  The sound of his head hitting the concrete was so loud that it was initially thought he had smuggled a dynamite cap into the prison and set it off with his teeth.

Bombing after his death

Muenter's wife received a note from her husband warning that a ship bound for England would sink on the 7th of July. On that day, just two days after his suicide, the crew was warned but they could not find the bomb on the SS Minnehaha. It exploded, but had been placed far away from the munitions and caused minor damage.

See also

 List of incidents of political violence in Washington, D.C.

References

 - Total pages: 336

Further reading 
 Dark Invasion: 1915: Germany's Secret War and the Hunt for the First Terrorist Cell in America by Howard Blum
 Ron Chernow: The House of Morgan. An American Banking Dynasty and the Rise of Modern Finance. Grove Press, 2001, 
 Thomas Joseph Tunney und Paul Merrick Hollister: Throttled! The Detection of the German and Anarchist Bomb Plotters. Small, Maynard & Company, 1919 
 Morris Bishop: A History of Cornell. Cornell University Press, 1962, 
 The Harvard Graduates' Magazine. Harvard Graduates' Magazine Association, 1934
 The New York Times Current History. The European War, Volume IV. The New York Times Co., 1915

External links 
 United States Senate: Bomb Rocks Capitol
 Newsday.com: His Calling Cards Were Guns

1871 births
1915 suicides
1915 crimes in the United States
Attacks on the United States Congress
American spies for Imperial Germany
Bombers (people)
Cornell University faculty
Failed assassins
German emigrants to the United States
Harvard University faculty
Harvard University Department of German faculty
Professors of German in the United States
People from Uelzen
Suicides in New York (state)
Terrorist incidents in the United States in the 1910s
World War I spies for Germany